Lars Mehrling Brownworth (born c. 1975) is an author and former United States history, political science and humanities teacher at The Stony Brook School in Stony Brook on Long Island, New York, who created the top 50 podcast, 12 Byzantine Rulers: The History of the Byzantine Empire. This podcast was created on a whim by Lars and his brother, Anders Brownworth. Often mistaken for a college professor, Lars was, in fact, a high school history instructor at the time the podcast was produced. 

On August 15, 2007, Brownworth announced that he had resigned from teaching to work on a book with Crown Publishing titled Lost to the West: The Forgotten Byzantine Empire that Rescued Western Civilization, which was published on September 15, 2009. On January 3, 2014, Brownworth released his second book, The Normans: From Raiders to Kings. His third book, titled The Sea Wolves: A History of the Vikings, was published in December 2014. A fourth book, In Distant Lands: A Short History of the Crusades, was released on April 10, 2017. His most recent book, The Caesars Volume 1: Julius Caesar - Roman Colossus, was released on January 11, 2021. It is half of a planned two-volume set which will trace the history of the murderous Julio-Claudian Dynasty. All of his previous books reached the New York Times Best Seller Lists.  He made his television debut in the Netflix series Rise of Empires: Ottomans, released in 2020. He maintains a blog called Finding History

He has been interviewed by The New York Times and NPR's "Here and Now", has written for The Wall Street Journal and resides in Stony Brook, New York, with his wife, the former Catherine Tipmore.  He used to serve as the chair of the history department at Washington Christian Academy in Olney, Maryland.

Influence
Brownworth is often seen as a pioneer of history podcasting, and his 12 Byzantine Rulers became a direct impetus for The History of Rome podcast.

See also
 The History of Rome podcast

References

External links
NYTimes review
A Soap Dish That Changed History
Why You're Wrong About The Crusades
NPR's Here and Now review
Newsday
USA Today
12 Byzantine Rulers: The History of The Byzantine Empire 
LarsBrownworth.com
NormanCenturies.com
Medievalists.net

1975 births
Living people
Political science educators
People in history occupations
American podcasters
The Stony Brook School alumni
People from Stony Brook, New York
People from Gaithersburg, Maryland
American high school teachers